Charles W. Famous (March 16, 1875 – October 17, 1938) was an American politician and physician from Maryland. He served as a member of the Maryland House of Delegates, representing Harford County in 1912.

Early life
Charles W. Famous was born on March 16, 1875. He graduated from the University of Maryland in 1901.

Career
After graduating, Famous started a medical practice in Street, Maryland, and worked there for 37 years.

Famous was a Republican. He served as a member of the Maryland House of Delegates, representing Harford County in 1912.

Famous was a director of Forest Hills State Bank.

Personal life
Famous married Annie W. Heaps. They had one son, Curtis I.

Famous died on October 17, 1938, at Union Memorial Hospital in Baltimore. He was buried at Slate Ridge Cemetery.

References

Year of birth missing
1870s births
1938 deaths
People from Harford County, Maryland
University System of Maryland alumni
Republican Party members of the Maryland House of Delegates
Physicians from Maryland
20th-century American politicians